Kim Ji-soo (Hangul: 김지수; born 22 July 1994) is a South Korean skeleton racer. He competed in the 2018 Winter Olympics.

Competitive Highlights

Olympic Games

World Championships

Skeleton World Cup

References

External links
Kim Ji-soo at the International Bobsleigh & Skeleton Federation

1994 births
Living people
Skeleton racers at the 2018 Winter Olympics
South Korean male skeleton racers
Olympic skeleton racers of South Korea